Chaullin Island is part of the Chiloé Archipelago in Chile.

See also
 Chaullin Island (Calbuco)

External links 
 geonames.org

Islands of Chiloé Archipelago